Giddh (The Vultures) is a 1984 Hindi film directed by T.S. Ranga starring Smita Patil, Om Puri and Nana Patekar among others. The film won Special Jury Award (32nd National Film Awards) for in-depth depiction of the helplessness of people struggling against the Devadasi tradition.

Plot
In a remote village at Karnataka-Maharashtra border in India, the poor residents follow Devadasi tradition according to which young girls are given up in the service of Goddess Yellamma. The landlords, priests and other men take advantage of these young girls and pimps like Veerapppan take them to brothels in Bombay. Bhashya, a laborer and his wife Hanumi lead an attempt at awakening against the practice by deciding to save Laksmi from becoming a Devadasi with the help of Masterji, going against the powerful feudal lord Desai.

Cast
Om Puri as Basya  
Smita Patil as Hanumi 
Nana Patekar as Veerappan
Savita Bajaj as Sundri 
Vikas Desai as Patil 
Vijay Kashyap as Katra 
Achyut Potdar as Desai 
M.K. Raina as Masterji

References

External links
 

1980s Hindi-language films
1984 films
Films about prostitution in India
Films scored by B. V. Karanth